Colchester North is a provincial electoral district in  Nova Scotia, Canada, that elects one member of the Nova Scotia House of Assembly. It was created in 1978 when the former district of Colchester was redistributed.

The Member of the Legislative Assembly is Tom Taggart of the Progressive Conservative Party of Nova Scotia, who replaced Karen Casey who had held the seat from 2006 to 2021 as both a Conservative and then a Liberal.

The riding includes the northern half of Colchester County. Communities include Debert, Great Village, and Tatamagouche.

Geography

Members of the Legislative Assembly
This riding has elected the following Members of the Legislative Assembly:

Election results

1978 general election

1981 general election

1984 general election

1988 general election

1993 general election

1998 general election

1999 general election

2003 general election

2006 general election

2009 general election

2013 general election

 
|Liberal
| Karen Casey 
|align="right"| 5,003
|align="right"| 61.00
|align="right"| 
|-
 
|Progressive Conservative
| John Kendrick MacDonald 
|align="right"| 2,162
|align="right"| 26.36
|align="right"| 
|-
 
|New Democratic Party
| Jim Wyatt
|align="right"| 1,037
|align="right"| 12.64
|align="right"| 

|}

2017 general election

2021 general election

References

External links
riding profile
June 13, 2006 Nova Scotia Provincial General Election Poll by Poll Results

Nova Scotia provincial electoral districts